This is a list of French television related events from 2006.

Events
8 June - Christophe Willem wins the fourth series of Nouvelle Star.
7 December - 27-year-old popper/b-boy Salah Benlemqawanssa wins the first series of Incroyable Talent.
22 December - Cyril Cinélu wins the sixth series of Star Academy.

Debuts
6 November - Incroyable Talent (2006–present)

Television shows

1940s
Le Jour du Seigneur (1949–present)

1950s
Présence protestante (1955-)

1970s
30 millions d'amis (1976-2016)

1990s
Sous le soleil (1996-2008)

2000s
Star Academy (2001-2008, 2012–2013)
Nouvelle Star (2003-2010, 2012–present)
Plus belle la vie (2004–present)
5, Rue Sésame (2005-2007)

Ending this year

Births

Deaths

See also
2006 in France